Ray County is a county located in the northwestern portion of the U.S. state of Missouri and is part of the Kansas City metropolitan area. As of the 2020 census, the population was 23,158. Its county seat is Richmond. The county was organized November 16, 1820 and named for John Ray, a Missouri state legislator and member of the first state Constitutional Convention.

Geography

Adjacent counties
Caldwell County (north)
Carroll County (east)
Lafayette County (south)
Jackson County (southwest)
Clay County (west)
Clinton County (northwest)

Major highways
 Route 10
 Route 13
 Route 210

National protected area
Big Muddy National Fish and Wildlife Refuge (part)

Demographics

As of the census of 2000, there were 23,354 people, 8,743 households, and 6,539 families residing in the county.  The population density was 16/km2 (41/mi2).  There were 9,371 housing units at an average density of 6/km2 (16/mi2).  The racial makeup of the county was 96.50% White, 1.46% Black or African American, 0.36% Native American, 0.19% Asian, 0.36% from other races, and 1.13% from two or more races. Approximately 1.08% of the population were Hispanic or Latino of any race. 29.6% were of American, 23.3% German, 11.5% English and 10.3% Irish ancestry.

There were 8,743 households, out of which 35.20% had children under the age of 18 living with them, 63.10% were married couples living together, 8.00% had a female householder with no husband present, and 25.20% were non-families. 22.10% of all households were made up of individuals, and 9.90% had someone living alone who was 65 years of age or older.  The average household size was 2.63 and the average family size was 3.07.

In the county, the population was spread out, with 27.50% under the age of 18, 7.40% from 18 to 24, 28.30% from 25 to 44, 23.90% from 45 to 64, and 12.80% who were 65 years of age or older.  The median age was 37 years. For every 100 females there were 100.20 males.  For every 100 females age 18 and over, there were 96.30 males.

The median income for a household in the county was $41,886, and the median income for a family was $49,192. Males had a median income of $36,815 versus $21,684 for females. The per capita income for the county was $18,685.  About 5.30% of families and 6.80% of the population were below the poverty line, including 8.00% of those under age 18 and 7.80% of those age 65 or over.

2020 Census

Education

Public schools
 Hardin-Central C-2 School District – Hardin
Hardin-Central Elementary School (PK-06)
Hardin-Central High School (07-12)
 Lawson R-XIV School District – Lawson
Southwest Elementary School (PK-04)
Lawson Middle School (05-08)
Lawson High School (09-12)
Orrick R-XI School District – Orrick
Orrick Elementary School (PK-06)
Orrick High School (07-12)
Richmond R-XVI School District – Richmond
Dear Elementary School (PK-01)
Sunrise Elementary School (02-05)
Richmond Middle School (06-08)
Richmond High School (09-12)

Public libraries
Ray County Library

Politics

Local
Politics at the local level in Ray County are now evenly divided between Republicans and Democrats, with Republicans making major gains in the past four election cycles, going from no representation before 2011 to now holding half of the county offices.

State

The northwest corner of Ray County is a part of Missouri's 8th District in the Missouri House of Representatives and is currently represented by Jim Neely (R-Cameron).

Most of Ray County is a part of Missouri's 39th District in the Missouri House of Representatives and is currently represented by Joe Don McGaugh (R-Carrollton). 

All of Ray County is a part of Missouri's 21st District in the Missouri Senate and is currently represented by Denny Hoskins (R-Warrensburg).

Federal

All of Ray County is included in Missouri's 5th Congressional District, which is currently represented by Emanuel Cleaver (D-Kansas City) in the United States House of Representatives.

Communities

Cities

Camden
Crystal Lakes
Excelsior Springs (mostly in Clay County)
Fleming
Hardin
Henrietta
Lawson (partly in Clay County)
Orrick
Richmond
Wood Heights

Villages
Elmira
Excelsior Estates (small part in Clay County)
Homestead

Census-designated place
Rayville

Other unincorporated communities

 Albany
 Dockery
 Elkhorn
 Floyd
 Georgeville
 Knoxville
 Lakeview
 Millville
 Morton
 New Garden
 Regal
 Rockingham
 Russellville
 Sandals
 St. Cloud
 Stet
 Swanwick
 Taitsville
 Tinney Grove
 Vibbard

Townships

 Camden
 Crooked River
 Fishing River
 Grape Grove
 Knoxville
 Orrick
 Polk
 Richmond

Notable people
Forrest Smith, Missouri's 42nd Governor
Robert Ford, outlaw, killer of Jesse James
Chad Kilgore, football player
Gordon Young, cowboy, journalist, novelist

See also
 Battle of Crooked River
 Mormon War (1838)
National Register of Historic Places listings in Ray County, Missouri

References

External links
 Digitized 1930 Plat Book of Ray County  from University of Missouri Division of Special Collections, Archives, and Rare Books

 
1820 establishments in Missouri Territory
Populated places established in 1820